Porrhomma convexum is a species of sheetweb spider in the family Linyphiidae. It is found in Canada, Europe, Caucasus, and Russia (European).

References

Linyphiidae
Articles created by Qbugbot
Spiders described in 1851